Kristopher Jameil Richard (born 1 March 1989) is a US-born Romanian professional basketball player for CSM Oradea of the Liga Națională.

Professional career
Before he came to Romania, he played professionally in Germany for Tigers Tübingen. In 2018, Richard signed with CSM U Oradea of the Liga Națională. During the 2019-20 season, he averaged 14 points per game. He signed with Stelmet Zielona Góra of the PLK and the VTB United League on October 19, 2020.

On May 22, 2021, he has signed with SIG Strasbourg of the French Pro A.

On July 2, 2021, he has signed with CSM Oradea of the Liga Națională.

Personal
Richard states that in his spare time, he enjoys fishing, golfing, and traveling.

References

External links
Profile at RealGM.com
Profile at Eurobasket.com

1989 births
Living people
American expatriate basketball people in Germany
American expatriate basketball people in Poland
American expatriate basketball people in Romania
American men's basketball players
Basket Zielona Góra players
Basketball players from Texas
CSM Oradea (basketball) players
Point guards
Romanian men's basketball players
Romanian people of African-American descent
Sportspeople from Beaumont, Texas
Tulane Green Wave men's basketball players